Song Ju-hun (born 13 January 1994) is a South Korean football player who currently plays as a defender for Gimcheon Sangmu in K League 1.

Club career
Song Ju-hun would play College football for Konkuk University in South Korea before joining Japanese football club Albirex Niigata on 16 January 2014. Song would make his debut on 30 August 2014 in a league game against Gamba Osaka that ended in a 5–0 defeat. After that game he was used sparingly and was sent on loan to second-tier club Mito HollyHock. Upon his return he would establish himself as a regular within the team, however he was part of the squad that was relegated to the second tier at the end of the 2017 J1 League season.

On 10 January 2019, Song returned to South Korea to join top-tier club Gyeongnam on a free transfer after his contract finished with Albirex Niigata. On 9 July 2019 he joined Chinese top-tier club Tianjin Tianhai. In July 2020, Song signed with Shenzhen FC on a six-month contract.

International career
Song Ju-hun would represent the South Korean U-20 team in the 2013 FIFA U-20 World Cup where he played in five games and scored one goal as his team were knocked out in the quarter-finals to Iraq in a penalty shoot-out.

He would go on to make his senior international debut on 10 October 2017 in a friendly match against Morocco that ended in a 3–1 defeat.

Career statistics

Club statistics
Updated to 31 November 2021.

International statistics

Honours

International
South Korea U-23
 King's Cup: 2015

References

External links
 
 

 
 Profile at Albirex Niigata
 

1994 births
Living people
South Korean footballers
South Korea under-17 international footballers
South Korea under-20 international footballers
South Korea under-23 international footballers
South Korea international footballers
South Korean expatriate footballers
J1 League players
J2 League players
Albirex Niigata players
Mito HollyHock players
South Korean expatriate sportspeople in Japan
South Korean expatriate sportspeople in China
Chinese Super League players
Tianjin Tianhai F.C. players
Shenzhen F.C. players
Jeju United FC players
Expatriate footballers in China
Konkuk University alumni
Association football defenders
People from Gumi, North Gyeongsang
Sportspeople from North Gyeongsang Province